Icușeni may refer to several villages in Romania:

 Icușeni, a village in Vorona Commune, Botoșani County
 Icușeni, a village in Victoria Commune, Iași County